Abdul Ghani Malik is an Indian politician and member of the Jammu & Kashmir National Conference. Malik is a member of the Jammu and Kashmir Legislative Assembly from the Gulabgarh constituency in Udhampur district. Malik was elected to the state legislative assembly in 1996 and made hatrick by winning the subsequent elections of 2002 and 2008. He was made a cabinet minister in 2009, in the Omar Abdullah led government, with the portfolios of higher education,  labour and employment.

References 

People from Udhampur district
Jammu & Kashmir National Conference politicians
Janata Dal politicians
Living people
21st-century Indian politicians
Year of birth missing (living people)
Jammu and Kashmir MLAs 1996–2002
Jammu and Kashmir MLAs 2002–2008
Jammu and Kashmir MLAs 2008–2014